Sammartino or Sanmartino is an Italian surname that may refer to:
Bruno Sammartino (1935-2018), Italian-born American professional wrestler
David Sammartino (born 1961), American professional wrestler, son of Bruno
Fred Sammartino, American communication engineer and company executive
Giuseppe Sanmartino (or Sammartino, 1720–1793), Italian sculptor
Janis Lynn Sammartino (born 1950), American judge 
Marco Sammartino, late 17th-century Italian painter and etcher 

Italian-language surnames